Alhassane Dosso (born 27 December 1989, in Sinfra) is an Ivorian footballer, who currently plays for Nigeria Premier League side Dolphins.

Career
Dosso began his career for Issia Wazi, and joined along with his Ivorian companions Maurice Bassolé and Mamadou Touré the Nigerian club Sharks in March 2005. He played his first professional game in the mid-season against Gombe United. He left Sharks on 3 January 2009 to join Lillestrøm SK for the 2009 season. On 16 March 2010, Lillestrøm announced he will play on loan for one season with Strømmen IF. He joined Kongsvinger in 2011. After a three-year stint with the Norwegian team, he returned to Nigeria for Dolphins in March 2014.

Career statistics

References

1989 births
Living people
Ivorian footballers
Issia Wazy players
Sharks F.C. players
Lillestrøm SK players
Strømmen IF players
Kongsvinger IL Toppfotball players
Dolphin F.C. (Nigeria) players
Eliteserien players
Norwegian First Division players
Ivorian expatriate footballers
Expatriate footballers in Nigeria
Expatriate footballers in Norway
Ivorian expatriate sportspeople in Norway
People from Sassandra-Marahoué District
Ivorian expatriate sportspeople in Nigeria
Association football midfielders